Cleti Ogeto is the Anglican Missionary Bishop of  Lodwar in Kenya.

References

21st-century Anglican bishops of the Anglican Church of Kenya
Living people
Year of birth missing (living people)
Anglican bishops of Lodwar